William Kramer may refer to:
 William M. Kramer (1920–2004), American rabbi, university professor and art collector
 William Kramer (athlete) (1884–1964), American long-distance runner.
 William Kramer (aviator), pilot involved in the Aeroméxico Flight 498 crash

See also
 Bill Kramer (born 1965), American attorney, businessman and member of the Wisconsin State Assembly